Synchronized is the fourth studio album from Canadian stoner rock band Sheavy.

Track listing

 "Firebird350" (2:43)
 "Last of the V8 Interceptors" (4:46)
 "Next Exit to Vertigo" (5:56)
 "Part of the Machine" (1:52)
 "Synchronized" (4:28)
 "Invasion of the Micronauts" (4:06)
 "Kill Queens Go Disco" (3:48)
 "Ultraglide" (7:08)
 "AFX... Thrown for a Loop" (4:10)
 "Set Phasers to Stun" (4:33)
 "The Time Machine" (4:49)

2002 albums
Sheavy albums
Rise Above Records albums